Thomas Lawranson (or Lawrenson) (fl. 1760–1777) was an Irish painter.

Lawranson signed the roll of the Incorporated Society of Artists in 1766, and is first styled a fellow of the society in 1774. He lived in Great Russell Street, Bloomsbury, London. A portrait of Lawranson was painted and engraved in mezzotint by his son William Lawranson.

Works

He appears in 1760 as an exhibitor at the first exhibition of the Society of Artists, sending a portrait of himself; he was subsequently a regular exhibitor until 1777, sending portraits or miniatures. In 1774 he exhibited a portrait which he had executed in 1783. He drew and published a large engraving of Greenwich Hospital.

Notes

References 
 Attribution

External links
 

18th-century Irish painters
Artists from London
Irish male painters
Irish portrait painters
People from Bloomsbury
Year of birth missing
Irish emigrants to Great Britain